X is the third mixtape by American hip hop recording artist Lucki, released on May 30, 2015 on his 19th birthday.

Track listing

2015 mixtape albums
Lucki albums